The name Abe has been used for two tropical cyclones in the Northwestern Pacific Ocean.

Typhoon Abe (1990), a Category 2 typhoon that brought heavy rain to the Philippines and Taiwan before making landfall in China
Typhoon Abe (1993), a Category 3 typhoon that made landfall in southern China

Pacific typhoon set index articles